James Leach may refer to:

James Leach (composer) (bapt. 1761–1798), British composer
James Leach (VC) (1892–1958), British Army Officer
Jim Leach (born 1942), American politician from Iowa
James Dickson Leach (1912–1992), British businessman in Hong Kong
James Madison Leach (1815–1891), Democratic politician from North Carolina
James Darrell Leach, former Canadian ambassador to Mexico
James Leach, British bass player with Sikth
James Thomas Leach (1805–1883), Confederate politician
Jimmie Leach (1922–2009), US Army officer